The Royal Commission for Al-'Ula (RCU) is a Saudi commission was established in July 2017 to preserve and develop the 2,000-year-old archaeological and historical site of Al-'Ula north-western Saudi Arabia.

Importance of Al-'Ula 
Al-'Ula is the home of The Archaeological Site of Al-Hijr (Madâin Sâlih), the largest conserved site of the civilization of the Nabataeans which is the first UNESCO  World Heritage property to be inscribed in Saudi Arabia.

Development 

On April 10, 2018, an agreement of cooperation was signed between Saudi Arabia and France to develop the site and transform it to a cultural site with the purpose to open the site to the regional and international visitors. the major components of the agreement were associated with the cultural, heritage, natural, tourism, human and economic development of Al-'Ula and including preservation and planning of the archaeological and architectural heritage.

Scholarship Program 
The RCU organizes a scholarship program where many Saudi students are sent to different universities in USA, UK, France and Australia. Under this scholarship, students study subjects related to the areas of hospitality, tourism, agriculture, archaeology and heritage. In 2019, 156 students, preparing for bachelor, master or PhD, are enrolled in the program that aims at enabling Saudi youth in general and residents of Ula in particular to work in the flourishing area.

The Royal Commission for Al-'Ula has concluded a partnership agreement with Ferrandi-Paris School to provide cooking training courses to chefs of ALUla. The trained chefs will then work during Tantourah Winter Festival to serve guests.

References 



Government agencies of Saudi Arabia
2017 establishments in Saudi Arabia